Jason Dale McBain (born April 12, 1974) is an American former professional ice hockey defenseman.  He was born in Ilion, New York, and grew up in Kimberley, British Columbia.  His brother Mike McBain also played professional hockey for the Tampa Bay Lightning.

Career
McBain played for the Lethbridge Hurricanes of the Western Hockey League, until being traded to the Portland Winterhawks one season later, and played three seasons with the Winterhawks.

McBain was drafted 81st overall in the 1992 NHL Entry Draft by the Hartford Whalers.  After McBain was drafted, he started out playing for his first of many minor league teams with the Springfield Falcons.  The next season he got called up to the Hartford Whalers roster to start the season, only playing 3 games, and getting sent back down to Springfield.  This happened one last time after the Whalers sent him down after only 6 games with the team.  From 1997 to 2000, McBain joined many minor league teams, including the Providence Bruins and Quebec Citadelles.  After the 2000 season, he left North America to play in the DEL in Germany for the Essen Mosquitoes and Revier Lions.  McBain then moved over to Sweden to play for Skelleftea AIK for less than half a season before moving back to North America.  For the last 2 seasons of his career, he became the first captain of the Las Vegas Wranglers franchise, retiring in 2005.

McBain is currently residing in Kimberley, British Columbia, working as a geologist/civil engineer.

Career statistics

External links
 

1974 births
Living people
American men's ice hockey defensemen
Canadian ice hockey defencemen
Cleveland Lumberjacks players
Grand Rapids Griffins (IHL) players
Hartford Whalers draft picks
Hartford Whalers players
Ice hockey people from British Columbia
Ice hockey players from New York (state)
Las Vegas Thunder players
Las Vegas Wranglers players
Lethbridge Hurricanes players
People from Herkimer County, New York
People from the Regional District of East Kootenay
Portland Winterhawks players
Providence Bruins players
Quebec Citadelles players
Springfield Falcons players